La Bataille syndicaliste ('Syndicalist Battle'), renamed Bataille on 30 September 1915, was a syndicalist morning daily published from Paris. It was the central organ of the Confédération générale du travail (CGT).

Publication history
The newspaper was founded in 1911. The founding nucleus of the newspaper consisted of Léon Jouhaux (secretary of the editorial bureau, representing the CGT), Harmel (joint secretary, representing postal workers), Dumas (treasurer, representing clothing workers) and Griffuelhes (administrator, representing leather and skin workers). Apart from editing La Bataille syndicaliste, the quartet also worked with the evening newspaper L'Intransigeant. The office of La Bataille syndicaliste was located at 10, boulevard Magenta. The first issue was published on April 27, 1911.

As of 1917 François Marie was the general secretary of the publication. Key contributors included Christiaan Cornelissen, J. Grave, L. Grandidier, Petr Kropotkin, P. Laval, E. Langevin, E. Le Guery and A. Violette. As of 1917 it claimed a circulation of 30,000.

Notable contributors
Notable contributors have included:

References

External links

1911 establishments in France
1930 disestablishments in France
Newspapers established in 1911
Revolutionary Syndicalism
Newspapers published in Paris
General Confederation of Labour (France)
Defunct newspapers published in France
Publications disestablished in 1920
Daily newspapers published in France